The women's 200 metres at the 2012 European Athletics Championships were held at the Helsinki Olympic Stadium on 29 and 30 June.

Medalists

Records

Schedule

Results

Round 1
First 4 in each heat (Q) and 4 best performers (q) advance to the Semifinals.

Wind:Heat 1: −0.6 m/s, Heat 2: 0.0 m/s, Heat 3: +0.6 m/s, Heat 4: +0.7 m/s, Heat 5: −0.6 m/s

Semifinals
First 2 in each heat (Q) and 2 best performers (q) advance to the Semifinals.

Wind:Heat 1: 0.0 m/s, Heat 2: −0.1 m/s, Heat 3: −0.2 m/s

Final
Wind: -1.3 m/s

References
 Round 1 Results
 Semifinal Results
 Final Results

200 W
200 metres at the European Athletics Championships
2012 in women's athletics